Jake is a masculine given name derived from Jacob. It can also be a nickname of Jacob and various other given names.

People with the given name "Jake" include

A
Jake Aarts (born 1994), Australian rules footballer
Jake Abel (born 1987), American actor
Jake Abel (rugby union) (born 1997), Australian rugby union footballer
Jake Abbott (born 1988), English rugby union footballer
Jake Adelson (born 1996), Australian footballer
Jake Adelstein (born 1969), American journalist
Jake Adicoff (born 1995), American skier
Jake Ahearn (1918–1968), American basketball player
Jake Allen (disambiguation), multiple people
Jake Allex (1887–1959), American soldier
Jake Allston (born 1986), American sound designer
Jake Alpert, British air force officer
Jake Anderegg, American politician
Jake Anderson (disambiguation), multiple people
Jake Andrewartha (born 1989), Australian judoka
Jake Andrews (disambiguation), multiple people
Jake Angeli (born 1988), American activist
Jake Areman (born 1996), American soccer player
Jake Arians (born 1978), American football player
Jake Armerding, American musician
Jake Armstrong (disambiguation), multiple people
Jake Arnold (disambiguation), multiple people
Jake Arnott (born 1961), British novelist
Jake Arrieta (born 1986), American baseball player
Jake Arteaga (born 2000), American soccer player
Jake Atlas (born 1994), American professional wrestler
Jake Atz (1879–1945), American baseball player
Jake Auchincloss (born 1988), American politician
Jake Auerbach (born 1958), British filmmaker
Jake T. Austin (born 1994), American actor
Jake Averillo (born 2000), Australian rugby league footballer
Jake Aydelott (1861–1926), American baseball player

B
Jake Bailey (disambiguation), multiple people
Jake Ball (disambiguation), multiple people
Jake Ballard (born 1987), American football player
Jake Ballestrino (born 1991), Australian Paralympic table tennis player
Jake Banta (born 1965), American politician
Jake Bargas (born 1996), American football player
Jake Barker-Daish (born 1993), Australian footballer
Jake Barrett (born 1991), American baseball player
Jake Barrett (footballer) (born 1995), Australian rules footballer
Jake Barton (born 1972), American designer
Jake Batchelor (born 1992), Australian rules footballer
Jake Batty (born 2005), English footballer
Jake Bauers (born 1995), American baseball player
Jake Beale (born 2001), Canadian actor
Jake Bean (born 1998), Canadian ice hockey player
Jake Beckford (born 1994), Costa Rican footballer
Jake Beckley (1867–1918), American baseball player
Jake Beesley (born 1996), English footballer
Jake Bell (born 1974), American writer
Jake Bennett (footballer) (born 1996), English footballer
Jake Bennett (baseball) (born 2000), American baseball player
Jake Bensted (born 1994), Australian judoka
Jake Bentley (born 1997), American football player
Jake Bequette (born 1989), American football player
Jake Bergey (born 1974), American lacrosse player
Jake Bernstein (journalist), American journalist
Jake Bernstein (market analyst) (born 1946), American market analyst
Jake Berry (born 1978), British politician
Jake Berthot (1939–2014), American artist
Jake Bezzant (born 1987/1988), New Zealand politician
Jake Bibby (born 1996), English rugby league footballer
Jake Bible, American writer
Jake Bickelhaupt, American chef
Jake Bidwell (born 1993), English footballer
Jake Bilardi (1996–2015), Australian terrorist
Jake Bird (1901–1949), American serial killer
Jake Bird (baseball) (born 1995), American baseball pitcher 
Jake Bischoff (born 1994), American hockey player
Jake Blackmore (??–1964), Welsh rugby league footballer
Jake Blount, American musician
Jake Blum, American politician
Jake Bobo (born 1998), American football player
Jake Bond (born 1992), American soccer player
Jake Borelli (born 1991), American actor
Jake Boritt, American filmmaker
Jake Bornheimer (1927–1986), American basketball player
Jake Borthwick (1912–2008), Scottish rugby league footballer
Jake Boss, American baseball coach
Jake Boultes (1884–1955), American baseball player
Jake Bowey (born 2002), Australian rules footballer
Jake Boyd (1874–1932), American baseball player
Jake Breeland (born 1997), American football player
Jake Brendel (born 1992), American football player
Jake Brennan (born 1974), American musician
Jake Brentz (born 1994), American baseball player
Jake Brewer (1981–2015), American political advisor
Jake Brigham (born 1988), American baseball player
Jake Brimmer (born 1998), Australian footballer
Jake Briningstool (born 2002), American football player
Jake Bronstein (born 1978), American entrepreneur
Jake Brown (disambiguation), multiple people
Jake Browning (born 1996), American football player
Jake Buchanan (born 1989), American baseball player
Jake Bugg (born 1994), English singer-songwriter
Jake Burbage (born 1992), American actor
Jake Burger (born 1996), American baseball player
Jake Burns (born 1958), Northern Irish rock musician
Jake Burns (rugby union) (born 1941), New Zealand rugby union footballer
Jake Burt (born 1996), American football player
Jake Burton (born 2001), English footballer
Jake Butcher (1936–2017), American politician
Jake Butler (born 1984), New Zealand footballer
Jake Butler-Fleming (born 1992), Australian rugby league footballer
Jake Butt (born 1995), American football player
Jake Buxton (born 1985), English footballer
Jake Byrne (born 1990), American football player

C
Jake Cabell (born 1954), American football coach
Jake Cain (born 2001), English footballer
Jake Camarda (born 1999), American football player
Jake Campos (born 1994), American football player
Jake Cannavale (born 1995), American actor
Jake Canuso (born 1970), Italian actor
Jake Caprice (born 1992), English footballer
Jake Carder (born 1995), Australian cricketer
Jake Carlisle (born 1991), Australian rules footballer
Jake Burton Carpenter (1954–2019), American snowboarder
Jake Carroll (born 1991), Irish footballer
Jake Carter (disambiguation), multiple people
Jake Cassidy (born 1993), Welsh footballer
Jake Caster, American surfer
Jake Caulfield (1917–1986), American baseball player
Jake Cavaliere (born 1972), American musician
Jake Cave (born 1992), American baseball player
Jake Cawsey (born 1993), English footballer
Jake Ceresna (born 1994), American football player
Jake Chapman (politician) (born 1984), American politician
Jake Charles (born 1996), English footballer
Jake Chelios (born 1991), American ice hockey player
Jake Childs, American record producer 
Jake Choi, American actor
Jake Christensen (born 1986), Canadian actor
Jake Christiansen (1900–1992), American football coach
Jake Christiansen (ice hockey) (born 1999), Canadian ice hockey player
Jake Cinninger (born 1975), American musician
Jake Clarke-Salter (born 1997), English footballer
Jake Clemons (born 1980), American singer-songwriter
Jake Clifford (born 1998), Australian rugby league footballer
Jake Cody (born 1988), English poker player
Jake Cohen (born 1990), American-Israeli basketball player
Jake Coker (born 1992), American football player
Jake Cole (born 1985), English footballer
Jake Colhouer (1922–1998), American football player
Jake Collier (born 1988), American mixed martial artist
Jake Cook (born 1993), British racing driver
Jake Connor (born 1994), English rugby league footballer
Jake Conroy (born 1976), American activist
Jake Cooper (disambiguation), multiple people
Jake Cooper-Woolley (born 1989), English rugby union footballer
Jake Copass (1920–2006), American poet
Jake Corman (born 1964), American politician
Jake Cousins (born 1994), American baseball player
Jake Crawford (1928–2008), American baseball player
Jake Cronenworth (born 1994), American baseball player
Jake Crouthamel (1938–2022), American football player and coach
Jake Crum (born 1991), American racing driver
Jake Cuenca (born 1987), Filipino actor and model
Jake Curhan (born 1998), American football player

D
Jake Dalton (born 1991), American gymnast
Jake Dan-Azumi, Nigerian social scientist
Jake Dancy (born 1978), American soccer player
Jake Daniel (1911–1996), American baseball player
Jake Daniels (born 2005), English footballer
Jake D'Arcy (1945–2015), Scottish actor
Jake Daubert (1884–1924), American baseball player
Jake Davis (disambiguation), multiple people
Jake Day (1892–1983), American artist 
Jake DeBrusk (born 1996), Canadian ice hockey player
Jake Deitchler (born 1989), American wrestler
Jake Delaney (born 1997), Australian tennis player
Jake Delhomme (born 1975), American football player
Jake Dengler (born 1999), American soccer player
Jake Dennis (born 1995), British racing driver
Jake DeRosier (1880–1913), Canadian motorcycle racer
Jake Dickert (born 1983), American football coach
Jake Diebler (born 1986), American basketball coach
Jake Diekman (born 1987), American baseball player
Jake Dillon (born 1993), Irish hurler
Jake Dixon (born 1996), British motorcycle racer
Jake Dobkin, American journalist
Jake Dodd (born 1995), Welsh boxer
Jake Dolegala (born 1996), American football player
Jake Donaghey (born 1994), Australian canoeist
Jake Doran (born 1996), Australian cricketer
Jake Doran (athlete) (born 2000), Australian athlete
Jake Dotchin (born 1994), Canadian ice hockey player
Jake Dowell (born 1985), American ice hockey player
Jake Doyle-Hayes (born 1998), Irish footballer
Jake Drake-Brockman (1955–2009), English musician
Jake Drauby (1864–1916), American baseball player
Jake Drew (born 2000), American stock car racing driver
Jake Dreyer (born 1992), American musician
Jake Duncombe (born 1988), Australian skateboarder
Jake Dunford (born 1994), Jersey cricketer
Jake Dunlap (1925–2010), Canadian football player
Jake Dunn (1909–1984), American baseball player
Jake Dunning (born 1988), American baseball player
Jake Dunwoody (born 1998), English footballer

E
Jake Early (1915–1985), American baseball player
Jake Eastwood (born 1996), English footballer
Jake Eaton (born 1981), American football player
Jake Eberts (1941–2012), Canadian film producer
Jake Eccleston (born 1995), English rugby league footballer
Jake Eckert (born 1976), American musician
Jake Edwards (disambiguation), multiple people
Jake Okechukwu Effoduh (born 1987), Nigerian radio personality
Jake Ehrlich (1900–1971), American lawyer
Jake Eidson (born 1995), Australian-American racing driver
Jake Eisenhart (1922–1987), American baseball player
Jake Ejercito (born 1990), Filipino actor
Jake Elder (1936–2010), American racing driver
Jake Eldrenkamp (born 1994), American football player
Jake Ellenberger (born 1985), American mixed martial artist
Jake Elliott (born 1995), American football player
Jake Ellis, American politician
Jake Ellwood (born 1970), Australian army officer
Jake Ellzey (born 1970), American politician
Jake Elmore (born 1987), American baseball player
Jake Elwes (born 1993), British media artist
Jake Epp (born 1939), Canadian politician
Jake Epstein (born 1987), Canadian actor and singer
Jake Esch (born 1990), American baseball player
Jake Evans (disambiguation), multiple people

F
Jake Faria (born 1993), American baseball player
Jake Farrow, American actor
Jake Fawcett (born 1990), Australian cricketer
Jake Feener (born 1992), American soccer player
Jake Fendley (1929–2002), American basketball player
Jake Fenlason (born 1993), American soccer player
Jake Fey (born 1949), American politician
Jake Fiechter (born 1946), American rower
Jake Files (born 1972), American politician
Jake Finch (born 2005), American stock car racing driver
Jake Findlay (born 1954), Scottish footballer
Jake Fisher (born 1993), American football player
Jake Fishman (born 1995), American-Israeli MLB and Olympic baseball player
Jake Freeman (born 1980), American hammer thrower
Jake Fried (born 1984), American artist
Jake Friend (born 1990), Australian rugby league footballer
Jake Fromm (born 1998), American football player
Jake Funk (born 1998), American football player
Jake Ferguson (born 1999), American football player
Jake Flake (1935–2008), American politician
Jake Flannery (born 1999), Irish rugby union footballer
Jake Flannigan (born 1996), English footballer
Jake Flint (1985–2022), American singer
Jake Flores, American comedian
Jake Flowers (1902–1962), American baseball player
Jake Fogelnest (born 1979), American writer
Jake Foley (born 1994), English cricketer
Jake Forbes (disambiguation), multiple people
Jake Ford (1946–1996), American basketball player
Jake Forster-Caskey (born 1994), English footballer
Jake Fox (born 1982), American baseball player
Jake Fraley (born 1995), American baseball player
Jake Fraser-McGurk (born 2002), Australian cricketer
Jake Freeze (1900–1983), American baseball player
Jake Froese (1925–2013), Canadian politician
Jake Xerxes Fussell (born 1981), American singer

G
Jake Gagne (born 1993), American motorcycle racer
Jake Gaither (1903–1994), American football coach
Jake Galea (born 1996), Maltese footballer
Jake Gannon (born 1987), American ice hockey player
Jake Garber (born 1965), American make-up artist
Jake Garcia (born 2005), American racing driver
Jake Gardiner (born 1990), American ice hockey player
Jake Garn (born 1932), American politician
Jake Garrett (born 2003), English footballer
Jake Gaudaur (1920–2007), Canadian football player
Jake Gelof (born 2002), American baseball player
Jake George (born 1994), English cricketer
Jake Gervase (born 1995), American football player
Jake Gettman (1875–1956), American baseball player
Jake Gibb (born 1976), American beach volleyball player
Jake Gibbs (born 1938), American baseball player
Jake Gibson (born 1997), New Zealand cricketer
Jake Girdwood-Reich (born 2004), Australian footballer
Jake Gleeson (born 1990), New Zealand footballer
Jake Godbold (1933–2020), American politician
Jake Gold (born 1958), American-Canadian music manager
Jake Goebbert (born 1987), American baseball player
Jake Goldberg (born 1996), American actor
Jake Goldsbie (born 1988), Canadian actor
Jake Goodman (disambiguation), multiple people
Jake Goodwin (born 1998), English cricketer
Jake Gordon (born 1993), Australian rugby union footballer
Jake Gosling, English music producer
Jake Gosling (footballer) (born 1993), English footballer
Jake Graf, English actor
Jake Granville (born 1989), Australian rugby league footballer
Jake Gray (disambiguation), multiple people
Jake Grech (born 1997), Maltese footballer
Jake Green (disambiguation), multiple people
Jake Grey (1984–2021), Samoan rugby union footballer
Jake Griffin (born 1998), American stock car racing driver
Jake Grove (born 1980), American football player
Jake Guentzel (born 1994), American ice hockey player
Jake Guzik (1886–1956), American mobster
Jake Gyllenhaal (born 1980), American actor

H
Jake Haberfield (born 1986), Australian cricketer
Jake Hackett (born 2000), English footballer
Jake Haener (born 1999), American football player
Jake Hager (disambiguation), multiple people
Jake Hallum (1938–2015), American football coach
Jake Halpern (born 1975), American writer
Jake Hamilton (born 1988), American reporter
Jake Hamilton (musician) (born 1979), American singer-songwriter
Jake Hammond (born 1991), Australian sprinter
Jake Hamon (disambiguation), multiple people
Jake Hancock (1928–2004), English geologist
Jake Hancock (cricketer) (born 1991), Australian cricketer
Jake Hanna (1931–2010), American drummer
Jake Hanrahan (born 1990), British journalist
Jake Hansen (disambiguation), multiple people
Jake Hanson (American football) (born 1997), American football player
Jake Harders, English actor
Jake Hartford (1949–2013), American radio host
Jake Harty (born 1991), Canadian football player
Jake Harvie (born 1998), Australian field hockey player
Jake Hastie (born 1999), Scottish footballer
Jake Hausmann (born 1998), American football player
Jake Heaps (born 1991), American football player
Jake Hecht (born 1984), American mixed martial artist
Jake Heenan (born 1992), New Zealand rugby union footballer
Jake Heggie (born 1961), American composer
Jake Hehl (1899–1961), American baseball player
Jake Helgren (born 1981), American film producer
Jake Hendriks (born 1981), English actor
Jake Herbert (born 1985), American wrestler
Jake Hesketh (born 1996), English footballer
Jake Hess (1927–2004), American singer
Jake Hessenthaler (born 1994), English footballer
Jake Hewitt (1870–1959), American baseball player
Jake Heyward (born 1999), Welsh runner
Jake Higginbottom (born 1993), Australian golfer
Jake Higgs (born 1975), Canadian curler
Jake High, American football player
Jake Highfill (born 1990), American politician
Jake Hildebrand (born 1993), American ice hockey player
Jake Hill (born 1994), American racing driver
Jake Hirst (born 1996), English footballer
Jake Hoeppner (1936–2015), Canadian politician
Jake Hoffman (disambiguation), multiple people
Jake Holden (born 1987), Canadian snowboarder
Jake Hollman (born 2001), Australian footballer
Jake Holmes (born 1939), American singer-songwriter
Jake Hook, English songwriter
Jake Hooker (disambiguation), multiple people
Jake Hoot (born 1988), America singer
Jake Howard (1945–2015), Australian rugby league footballer
Jake Howe (born 1991), Australian wheelchair rugby union footballer
Jake Howells (born 1991), British footballer
Jake Hughes (born 1994), British racing driver
Jake Hull (born 2001), English footballer
Jake Hummel (born 1999), American football player
Jake Humphrey (born 1978), English sports television presenter
Jake Hurwitz (born 1985), American comedian
Jake Hutson (born 1994), English cricketer
Jake Hyde (born 1990), English professional footballer

I
Jake Iceton (1903–1981), English footballer
Jake Ilardi (born 1997), American skateboarder
Jake Ilnicki (born 1992), Canadian rugby union footballer
Jake Ingram (born 1985), American football player
Jake Ireland (born 1946), Canadian football referee

J
Jake Jacobs (1937–2010), American baseball player
Jake Jacobson (1940–2021), American businessman
Jake Jaeckel (born 1942), American baseball player
Jake Jarman (born 2001), English artistic gymnast
Jake Jervis (born 1991), English footballer
Jake Jewell (born 1993), American baseball player
Jake Johannsen (born 1960), American comedian
Jake Johnson (disambiguation), multiple people
Jake Jones (disambiguation), multiple people
Jake Josvanger (1908–1966), Canadian politician
Jake Joy, American soccer player

K
Jake Kafora (1888–1928), American baseball player
Jake Kalish (born 1991), American baseball player
Jake Kambos (born 1999), Greek rugby league footballer
Jake Kaminski (born 1988), American archer
Jake Kaner (born 1959), American academic administrator
Jake Kasdan (born 1974), American filmmaker
Jake Kaufman (born 1981), American music composer
Jake Kean (born 1991), English footballer
Jake Keegan (born 1991), American soccer player
Jake Kelchner (born 1970), American football player
Jake Kelly (disambiguation), multiple people
Jake Keough (born 1987), American cyclist
Jake Kerr (disambiguation), multiple people
Jake Kilrain (1859–1937), American heavyweight boxer
Jake Kilrain (British boxer) (1914–1984), Scottish boxer
Jake King (born 1984), Australian rules footballer
Jake King (footballer, born 1955) (born 1955), Scottish footballer
Jake Kirby (born 1994), English footballer
Jake Kirkpatrick (born 1987), American football player
Jake Knotts (born 1944), American politician
Jake Knowdell (1852–1887), American baseball player
Jake Kolodjashnij (born 1995), Australian rules footballer
Jake Kostecki (born 2000), Australian racing driver
Jake Kozloff (1901–1976), Russian-American businessman
Jake Krack (born 1984), American fiddler
Jake Krull (1938–2016), American military officer
Jake Kumerow (born 1992), American football player
Jake Kupp (born 1941), American football player
Jake Kuresa (born 1983), American football player

L
Jake La Botz (born 1968), American singer-songwriter
Jake LaCava (born 2001), American soccer player
Jake Lacy (born 1985), American actor
Jake La Furia (born 1979), Italian rapper
Jake Lamar (born 1961), American writer
Jake Lamb (born 1990), American football player
Jake LaMotta (1922–2017), American boxer
Jake Lampman (born 1993), American football player
Jake Lanum (1896–1968), American football player
Jake Lappin (born 1992), Australian wheelchair runner
Jake Larkins (born 1994), English footballer
Jake Larsson (born 1999), Swedish footballer
Jake LaTurner (born 1988), American politician
Jake Lawlor (disambiguation), multiple people
Jake Layman (born 1994), American basketball player
Jake LeDoux (born 1985), Canadian actor
Jake Lee (disambiguation), multiple people
Jake Leeker (born 1995), American soccer player
Jake Lehmann (born 1992), Australian cricketer
Jake Leicht (1919–1992), American football player
Jake Leinenkugel (born 1952), American businessman and politician
Jake Leith (born 1958), English businessman
Jake Lemmerman (born 1989), American baseball player
Jake Lemoine (born 1993), American baseball player
Jake Leschyshyn (born 1999), American-Canadian ice hockey player
Jake Lever (born 1996), Australian rules footballer
Jake Libby (born 1993), English cricketer
Jake Lilley (born 1993), Australian sailor
Jake Lindsey (disambiguation), multiple people
Jake Lingle (1891–1930), American reporter
Jake Lintott (born 1993), English cricketer
Jake Livermore (born 1989), English footballer
Jake Livingstone (1880–1949), Russian-American baseball player
Jake Lloyd (disambiguation), multiple people
Jake Locker (born 1988), American football player
Jake Lodwick (born 1981), American software engineer
Jake Logan (wrestler) (born 1993), American professional wrestler
Jake Logue (born 1972), American football player
Jake Long (disambiguation), multiple people
Jake Longstreth (born 1977), American painter
Jake Lowery (born 1990), American baseball coach
Jake Lucas, American child actor
Jake Lucchini (born 1995), Canadian ice hockey player
Jake Ludington (born 1973), American writer
Jake Luhrs (born 1985), American musician
Jake Luton (born 1996), American football player
Jake Lynch (born 1965), British journalist

M
Jake MacDonald (1949–2020), Canadian author
Jake Madden (1865–1948), Scottish footballer
Jake Maier (born 1997), Canadian football player
Jake Maizen (born 1997), Italian rugby league footballer
Jake Malone (born 1996), Irish hurler
Jake Maltby (born 2000), English footballer
Jake Mamo (born 1994), Australian rugby league footballer
Jake Mangum (born 1996), American baseball player
Jake Manley (born 1991), Canadian actor
Jake Marisnick (born 1991), American baseball player
Jake Marketo (born 1989), Australian rugby league footballer
Jake Maskall (born 1971), English actor
Jake Mason, Australian musician
Jake Mathews (born 1971), Canadian singer-songwriter
Jake Matthews (disambiguation), multiple people
Jake Mauer (born 1978), American baseball player
Jake McCabe (born 1993), American ice hockey player
Jake McCandless (1930–2007), American athletics coach
Jake McCarthy (born 1997), American baseball player
Jake McCoy (1942–2021), American ice hockey player
Jake McCullough (born 1965), American football player
Jake McDonough (born 1989), American football player
Jake McDorman (born 1986), American actor
Jake McGann (born 1990), English actor
Jake McGee (born 1986), American baseball player
Jake McGing (born 1994), Australian footballer
Jake McGoldrick, American teacher
Jake McGuire (born 1994), American soccer player
Jake McIntyre (born 1994), Australian rugby union footballer
Jake McLaughlin (born 1982), American actor
Jake McLeod (born 1994), Australian golfer
Jake McNiece (1919–2013), American soldier
Jake McQuaide (born 1987), American football player
Jake Melksham (born 1991), Australian rules footballer
Jake A. Merrick (born 1981), American politician
Jake Metcalfe (born 1958), American lawyer
Jake Metz (born 1991), American football player
Jake Meyer (born 1984), British mountaineer
Jake Meyers (born 1996), American baseball player
Jake Michel (born 1997), Australian Paralympic swimmer
Jake Milford (1914–1984), Canadian ice hockey player
Jake Millar (1995–2021), New Zealand entrepreneur
Jake Miller (disambiguation), multiple people
Jake Milliman (born 1947), American professional wrestler
Jake Mitchell (born 2001), American swimmer
Jake Monaco (born 1982), American composer
Jake Moody (born 2000), American football player
Jake Mooty (1912–1970), American baseball player
Jake Moreland (born 1977), American football player
Jake Morley (born 1983), British singer-songwriter
Jake Morris (soccer) (born 1999), American soccer player
Jake Morris (hurler) (born 1999), Irish hurler
Jake Mosser, American actor 
Jake Mulford (born 2004), English racing driver
Jake Mullaney (born 1990), Australian rugby league footballer
Jake Mulraney (born 1996), Irish footballer
Jake Munch (1890–1966), American baseball player
Jake Murphy (born 1989), American football player
Jake Muxworthy (born 1978), American actor
Jake Muzzin (born 1989), Canadian ice hockey player

N
Jake Nagode (1915–1976), American basketball player
Jake Najor, American drummer 
Jake Nava, British music director
Jake Neade (born 1994), Australian rules footballer
Jake Needham (disambiguation), multiple people
Jake Nerwinski (born 1994), American soccer player
Jake Nevin (1910–1985), American athletic trainer
Jake Newberry (born 1994), American baseball player
Jake Newton (disambiguation), multiple people
Jake Neighbours (born 2002), Canadian ice hockey player
Jake Niall, American sports journalist
Jake Nicholson (born 1992), English footballer
Jake Noll (born 1994), American baseball player
Jake Nordin (born 1984), American football player
Jake Norris (born 1999), British athlete
Jake Northrop (1888–1945), American baseball player

O
Jake O'Brien (disambiguation), multiple people
Jake O'Connell (born 1985), American football player
Jake O'Donnell (born 1937), American basketball referee
Jake Odorizzi (born 1990), American baseball player
Jake Odum (born 1991), American basketball coach
Jake Oettinger (born 1998), American ice hockey player
Jake Offiler, English rower
Jake O'Kane (born 1961), Northern Irish comedian
Jake Olson (born 1989), American football player
Jake One (born 1976), American record producer
Jake Ootes (born 1942), Canadian politician
Jake Orrell (born 1997), English footballer
Jake Ouimet (born 1973), American soccer player
Jake Owen (born 1981), American singer-songwriter

P
Jake Packard (born 1994), Australian swimmer
Jake Paltrow (born 1975), American film director
Jake Paque, American voice actor
Jake Paringatai (born 1980), New Zealand rugby union footballer
Jake Parker (born 1977), American comic book writer
Jake Pascual (born 1988), Filipino basketball player
Jake Passmore (born 2005), Irish diver
Jake Pates (born 1998), American snowboarder
Jake Paul (born 1997), American professional boxer
Jake Pavelka (born 1978), American television personality
Jake Peavy (born 1981), American baseball player
Jake Peck (born 2000), English footballer
Jake Peetz (born 1983), American football coach
Jake Pelkington (1916–1982), American basketball player
Jake Pemberton (born 1996), American-Israeli basketball player
Jake Petricka (born 1988), American baseball player
Jake Phelps (1962–2019), American skateboarder
Jake Picking (born 1991), American actor
Jake Pitler (1894–1968), American baseball player
Jake Pitts (born 1985), American guitarist
Jake Plummer (born 1974), American football player
Jake Polledri (born 1995), English rugby union footballer
Jake Porter (1916–1993), American trumpeter
Jake Powell (1908–1948), American baseball player
Jake Pratt (born 1996), English actor
Jake Propst (1895–1967), American baseball player
Jake Pugh (born 1960), British businessman and politician
Jake Putnam (born 1956), American journalist

Q
Jake Quickenden (born 1988), English singer

R
Jake Raburn (born 1985), American politician
Jake Rathwell (born 1947), Canadian ice hockey player
Jake Reed (disambiguation), multiple people
Jake Reeves (born 1993), English footballer
Jake Reinhart, American photographer
Jake Reinhart (Canadian football) (born 1989), Canadian football player
Jake Riccardi (born 1999), Australian rules footballer
Jake Richardson (born 1985), American actor
Jake Riley (runner) (born 1988), American runner
Jake Riviera (born 1948), British entrepreneur
Jake Robbins (born 1976), American baseball player
Jake Roberts (born 1955), American professional wrestler
Jake Roberts (film editor) (born 1977), English film editor
Jake Robertson (born 1989), New Zealand runner
Jake Robertson (musician), Australian musician
Jake Robinson (born 1986), English footballer
Jake Rodenhouse (born 1982), American record producer
Jake Rodgers (born 1991), American football player
Jake Rodkin, American video game designer
Jake Rodríguez (born 1965), Puerto Rican boxer
Jake Rogers (born 1995), American baseball player
Jake Wesley Rogers (born 1996), American musician
Jake Rooney (born 2003), English footballer
Jake Roos (born 1980), South African golfer
Jake Roper (born 1987), American social media entrepreneur
Jake Rosenzweig (born 1989), English racing driver
Jake Rosholt (born 1982), American mixed martial artist
Jake Roxas (born 1977), Filipino actor
Jake Rozhansky (born 1996), American-Israeli soccer player
Jake Rudock (born 1993), American football player
Jake Ruby (born 2000), Canadian soccer player
Jake Ruecroft (1915–2005), English footballer
Jake Rufe (born 1996), American soccer player
Jake Runestad (born 1986), American composer
Jake Rush, American attorney
Jake Ryan (disambiguation), multiple people

S
Jake Sagare (born 1980), American soccer player
Jake Sanchez (born 1989), Mexican-American baseball player
Jake Sanderson (born 2002), Canadian-American ice hockey player
Jake Sandvig (born 1986), American actor
Jake Sasseville (born 1985), American entrepreneur
Jake Saunders (1917–2002), English banking executive
Jake Saunders (writer) (born 1947), American author
Jake Schatz (born 1990), Australian rugby union footballer
Jake Schifino (born 1979), American football player
Jake Schindler (born 1989), American poker player
Jake Schreier (born 1981), American film director
Jake Schuehle (1917–2001), American football player
Jake Schum (born 1989), American football player
Jake Scott (disambiguation), multiple people
Jake Scrimshaw (born 2000), English footballer
Jake Seal, British film producer
Jake Seamer (1913–2006), English cricketer
Jake Sedgemore (born 1978), English footballer
Jake Seymour (1854–1897), American baseball player
Jake Shears (born 1978), American singer
Jake Sheridan (born 1986), English footballer
Jake Sherman (disambiguation), multiple people
Jake Shields (born 1979), American mixed martial artist
Jake Shimabukuro (born 1976), American ukulele player
Jake Shorrocks (born 1995), English rugby league footballer
Jake Short (born 1997), American actor
Jake Siciliano (born 1998), American actor
Jake Siegel (born 1989), American actor
Jake Siemens (1896–1963), Canadian farmer
Jake Siewert (born 1964), American political advisor
Jake Silas (born 1991), Canadian football player
Jake Silbermann (born 1983), American actor
Jake Silverberg (born 1996), American cyclist
Jake Silverstein (born 1975), American writer
Jake Simmons Jr. (1901–1981), American entrepreneur
Jake Simpkin (born 2001), Australian rugby league footballer
Jake Sinclair (born 1994), English footballer
Jake Sinclair (musician) (born 1985), American record producer
Jake Smith (disambiguation), multiple people
Jake Smolinski (born 1989), American baseball player
Jake Smollett (born 1989), American actor
Jake Snider (born 1976), American vocalist
Jake Something (born 1989), American professional wrestler
Jake Spavital (born 1985), American football coach
Jake Spedding (born 1996), English rugby league footballer
Jake Speight (born 1985), English footballer
Jake Spencer (disambiguation), multiple people
Jake Sprague (born 1984), American rugby union footballer
Jake Stahl (1879–1922), American baseball player
Jake Stahl (American football) (1891–1966), American football player
Jake Stein (born 1994), Australian rules footballer
Jake Steinfeld (born 1958), American actor
Jake Stenzel (1867–1919), American baseball player
Jake Stephens (1900–1981), American baseball player
Jake Stewart (disambiguation), multiple people
Jake Stone (disambiguation), multiple people
Jake Stoneburner (born 1989), American football player
Jake Stormoen (born 1988), American actor
Jake Stovall (born 1994), American soccer player
Jake Strachan (born 1996), Australian rugby union footballer
Jake Striker (1933–2013), American baseball player
Jake Stringer (born 1994), Australian rules footballer
Jake Stuart (born 1991), Cook Islands footballer
Jake Sullivan (born 1976), American political advisor
Jack Swagger (born 1982), American professional wrestler
Jake Sweeting (born 1999), English rugby league footballer
Jake Swirbul (1898–1960), American aviator
Jake Szymanski, American actor

T
Jake Tapp (born 1988), Canadian swimmer
Jake Tapper (born 1969), American journalist
Jake Taylor (disambiguation), multiple people
Jake Teshka, American politician
Jake Thackray (1938–2002), English singer-songwriter
Jake Thielman (1879–1928), American baseball player
Jake Thies (1926–2013), American baseball player
Jake Thomas (born 1990), American actor and singer
Jake Thomas (Canadian football) (born 1990), Canadian football player
Jake Thompson (born 1994), American baseball player
Jake Thomson (born 1989), English footballer
Jake Tilson (born 1958), American artist
Jake Tolbert, American baseball player
Jake Tonges (born 1999), American football player
Jake Toolson (born 1996), American basketball player
Jake Tordesillas (1949–2017), Filipino screenwriter
Jake Traeger, American soccer player
Jake Trbojevic (born 1994), Australian rugby league player
Jake Trotter (born 1981), American sports writer
Jake Tsakalidis (born 1979), Georgian-Greek basketball player
Jake Tuli (1931–1998), South African boxer
Jake Turner (disambiguation), multiple people
Jake Turpin (born 1996), Australian rugby league footballer
Jake Turx (born 1986), American journalist

U
Jake Udell (born 1989), American entrepreneur

V
Jake Vargas (born 1992), Filipino actor
Jake Varner (born 1986), American wrestler
Jake Vedder (born 1998), American snowboarder
Jake Verity (born 1997), American football player
Jake Vincent (born 1989), British water polo player
Jake Virtanen (born 1996), Canadian ice hockey player
Jake Virtue (1865–1943), American baseball player
Jake Vokins (born 2000), English footballer
Jake Volz (1878–1962), American baseball player
Jake Voskuhl (born 1977), American basketball player

W
Jake Wade (disambiguation), multiple people
Jake Walker (disambiguation), multiple people
Jake Walman (born 1996), Canadian ice hockey player
Jake Walsh (born 1995), American baseball player
Jake Wardle (born 1998), English rugby league footballer
Jake Warga (born 1972), American journalist
Jake Warren (1921–2008), American diplomat
Jake Waterman (born 1998), Australian rules footballer
Jake Waters (born 1992), American football player
Jake Watson (1973–1999), American cyclist
Jake Weary (born 1990), American actor
Jake Weatherald (born 1994), Australian cricketer
Jake Weber (born 1964), English actor
Jake Weber (basketball) (1918–1990), American basketball player
Jake Webster (born 1983), New Zealand rugby league footballer
Jake Weimer (1873–1928), American baseball player
Jake Wells (1863–1927), American baseball player
Jake West (born 1972), British film director
Jake Westbrook (born 1977), American baseball player
Jake Wetzel (born 1976), Canadian rower
Jake Wheatley (born 1971), American politician
Jake White (born 1963), South African rugby coach
Jake Wholey (born 1993), English footballer
Jake Wieneke (born 1994), American football player
Jake Wightman (born 1994), British runner
Jake Williams (born 1974), British music producer
Jake Williams (American football) (1905–1967), American football player
Jake Winebaum (born 1959), American entrepreneur
Jake Wingfield (born 2001), English rugby league footballer
Jake Winter (born 1997), Australian cricketer
Jake Wood (disambiguation), multiple people
Jake Woodford (born 1996), American baseball player
Jake Woods (born 1981), American baseball player
Jake Woolmore (born 1990), English rugby union footballer
Jake Wright (born 1986), English footballer

Y
Jake Yapp (born 1973), American comedian
Jake Adam York (1972–2012), American poet
Jake Young (American football) (1968–2002), American football player
Jake Young (footballer) (born 2001), English footballer
Jake Yuzna (born 1982), American film director

Z
Jake Zamansky (disambiguation), multiple people 
Jake Zemke (born 1975), American motorcycle racer
Jake Zim (born 1976), American corporate executive
Jake Zimmerman (born 1974), American politician
Jake Zumbach (born 1950), Canadian football player
Jake Zyrus (born 1992), Filipino singer

Fictional characters named Jake
Jake, one of The Blues in Angry Birds
Jake Dean, character on the British soap opera Hollyoaks
Jake the Dog, character in the animated series Adventure Time
Jake Hunter, character in the video game series of the same name
Jake Martin (disambiguation), multiple fictional characters
Jake McKinnon, character on the television series Another World
Jake Moon, character on the soap opera EastEnders
Jake Sisko, character on the television series Star Trek
Jake Stevens, fictional television personality played by P. J. Gallagher
Jake Sully, character on the film series Avatar

See also
Jake (disambiguation), a disambiguation page for "Jake"
Jakes (disambiguation), a disambiguation page for "Jakes"

English masculine given names
Masculine given names
Lists of people by nickname